Cristaria is a genus of freshwater mussels or pearl mussels, aquatic bivalve mollusks in the family Unionidae.

Species
Species in the genus Cristaria include:

 Cristaria beirensis
 Cristaria plicata
 Cristaria radiata
 Cristaria tenuis
 Cristaria truncata

Human relevance
In China, one of the species in this genus, Cristaria plicata is "one of the most important freshwater mussels for pearl production" in the country. It is also used for medicinal purposes.

References

Unionidae
Bivalve genera